SR-16435 is a drug which acts as a potent partial agonist at both the μ-opioid receptor and nociceptin receptor. In animal studies it was found to be a potent analgesic, with results suggestive of reduced development of tolerance and increased activity against neuropathic pain compared to classic μ-selective agonists.

See also 
 Cebranopadol
 Brorphine
 J-113,397
 SR-17018

References 

Mu-opioid receptor agonists